Gwaun Lydan is the top of Aran Fawddwy in the south of the Snowdonia National Park in Gwynedd, Wales. It is located at the end of the south ridge. The summit comprises a small boggy plateau, the highest point being a peat hag marked by a few stones.

The summit panorama includes the eastern face of Aran Fawddwy with Creiglyn Dyfi below. To the north is Esgeiriau Gwynion and Llechwedd Du. Heading east, Pen yr Allt Uchaf can be reached.

References

External links
 www.geograph.co.uk : photos of Aran Fawddwy and surrounding area

Nuttalls
Mountains and hills of Snowdonia
Mountains and hills of Gwynedd
Mawddwy